Donald MacGregor (1839 – 20 July 1911) was a Scottish Liberal Party politician. From 1892 to 1895 he was a member of parliament (MP) for the Inverness-shire constituency. 

He is buried in London at St Mary Magdalen Roman Catholic Church Mortlake.

References

Sources

External links 

1839 births
1911 deaths
Burials at St Mary Magdalen Roman Catholic Church Mortlake
Members of the Parliament of the United Kingdom for Scottish constituencies
Scottish Liberal Party MPs
UK MPs 1892–1895